Walter House may refer to:

Martin Walter House, Pueblo, Colorado, listed on the National Register of Historic Places (NRHP) in Colorado
Walter-Gimble House, Davenport, Iowa, listed on the NRHP
Lowell E. Walter House, Quasqueton, Iowa, listed on the NRHP
Walter House (Melbourne, Kentucky), listed on the NRHP
Peter D. Walter House, Lockport, New York, listed on the NRHP
Henry Walter House, Blainsport, Pennsylvania, listed on the NRHP
John Walter Farmstead, Export, Pennsylvania, listed on the NRHP
Walter-Heins House, Eau Claire, Wisconsin, listed on the NRHP in Wisconsin
Luther and Anna Walter Boathouse, Minocqua, Wisconsin, listed on the NRHP in Wisconsin

See also
Walters House (disambiguation)